Pooja Singhal (born 7 July 1978) is an Indian civil servant. She served as mining secretary of the state of Jharkhand until being separated from her duties in May 2022 after her arrest on money laundering charges.

Early life and career
Singhal was born on 7 July 1978 in Dehradun in Uttrakhand. She joined the Indian Administrative Service at the age of 21, making her among the country's youngest civil officers. In 2004, she was posted to a position in the Jharkhand state department of health and family welfare, where she was in charge of the Rajendra Institute of Medical Sciences; after several postings in local areas, she became an event coordinator for the state government in 2014 before working in the agriculture department and then being named secretary of the mines and industries departments in 2021.

Money laundering case
In May 2022, Pooja Singhal was arrested and was produced before the court of PK Sharma, the designated court to hear money laundering cases in Ranchi. The mining secretary was arrested in connection to money laundering linked to alleged embezzlement of MGNREGA funds. The federal agency had conducted raids throughout different locations across four states regarding the case and recovered ₹ from a chartered accountant associated with Singhal and her husband. The Jharkhand state government suspended her from her duties as mining secretary. On 25 May, Singhal was sent to judicial custody for two weeks, a day after Enforcement Directorate officials raided six locations in Ranchi and one in Muzaffarpur in Bihar in connection with the inquiry.

Personal life
Her first husband was fellow IAS officer Rahul Parwar; they divorced, and she later married a businessman, Abhishek Jha.

References

1978 births
Living people